Cassowary is a large flightless bird native to Australia and New Guinea.

Cassowary may also refer to:
 Cassowary (software), a toolkit to solve equations on a computer
 Cassowary plum, Cerbera floribunda, poisonous plant
 Cassowary Coast Region, local government in Queensland